De Krijtberg Kerk is a Roman Catholic church in Amsterdam, located at the Singel. The church was designed by Alfred Tepe and was opened in 1883. The exuberant interior was made by Friedrich Wilhelm Mengelberg.

History
The church is dedicated to St Francis Xavier and is one of the rectorates within the Roman Catholic parish of St Nicholas, and is recognised by its two pointed towers.  Since 1654 there has been a Jesuit church at this location. The original clandestine church was replaced by another one in 1677. The current Neo-Gothic church was built on the same space in 1881. Space limitations urged architect Alfred Tepe to design an unusually tall church with a monumental front. The interior was provided by members of the Guild of St. Bernulphus, most notable the Mengelberg firm. Most of interior has survived.
Services there are in a variety of styles.

Ignatius House
Next to the church is Ignatius House (Dutch, "Ignatiushuis"). It is a spirituality and cultural centre also of the Society of Jesus. It was founded in 1985 as a non-residential spirituality centre with Paul Begheyn as director. It moved to its present location in 2000. It is dedicated to Ignatius of Loyola the founder of the Jesuits. It primarily runs courses and retreats on Ignatian spirituality for Dutch speakers. Although, it has Jesuits on the staff, it is run by a team of lay people, members of other Catholic religious orders and other Christian denominations. The building consists of three large rooms, the Great Hall that can fit 50 people in theatre-style seating, an upper room for meetings, lectures, courses and workshops and a meditation room for reflective activities.

Services
Sunday
1715 Vigil Eucharist with Dutch religious songs
0930 High Mass with Latin hymns
1100 High Mass with Gregorian chant
1230 Eucharist
1715 Eucharist with cantor
Monday-Friday
1230 Eucharist
1745 Eucharist
Saturday
 1230 Eucharist
 1600-1700 Sacrament of Reconciliation

Interior

See also
 Society of Jesus
 Ignatian spirituality
 List of Jesuit sites in the Netherlands
 List of Catholic churches in the Netherlands

References

External links

De Krijtberg

Krijtberg
Amsterdam, Krijtberg
Krijtberg
Roman Catholic churches in the Netherlands
Spiritual retreats
Ignatian spirituality
Gothic Revival church buildings in the Netherlands
1654 establishments in the Dutch Republic